The Tazón México (English: Mexico Bowl) is the annual championship game of the Liga de Fútbol Americano Profesional, the highest level of professional American football in Mexico. As with the Super Bowl, Roman numerals are used to identify each game, rather than the year in which it is held. The game was typically played on the last Sunday of April, but from the 2019 season will be played on the second Sunday of May.

Of the twelve teams that have competed in LFA, seven had appeared in Tazón Mexico. Four teams had won the championship at least once.

History
The LFA held the first two Tazón México games at Estadio Jesús Martínez "Palillo" in the Magdalena Mixhuca Sports City in Mexico City in 2016 and 2017. The Mayas won those first two Tazón México games, the most of any team. The venue was changed for the 2018 season and Tazón México III was held at Estadio Azul, originally used for football and which has a larger capacity. The Mexicas would win their first title in front of 15,000 spectators, less than half of the venue's capacity. Tazón México IV was also held at Estadio Azul, with the attendance increasing slightly from the previous year to 18,000.

In December 2019, it was announced that the game would change its venue from Estadio Azul to Estadio Azteca to host Tazón México V, the 2020 season championship game. But due to the COVID-19 pandemic, the 2020 LFA season was cancelled (along with the 2021 season) and Tazón México V was not played. In May 2022, the Tazón México was held outside of Mexico City for the first time. Tazón México V was played in Tijuana at Estadio Caliente. The Fundidores defeated Gallos Negros 18–14 to win their first title.

Results

Appearances by team

Records
 Most Tazón México Bowl wins: 2, Mayas (I, II)
 Most Tazón México Bowl Appearances: 3, Raptors (I, III, lV)
 Most Points Scored Combined: 42 (I, II)
 Most Points Scorded by Team: 29, Mayas (I)
 Coach with the most victories: 2, Ernesto Alfaro (Mayas)
 Most Touchdown Passes: 2, QB Marco García (I)
 Most Rushing Touchdowns: 2, RB Omar Cojolum (I)
 Touchdown Catches: 2, WR Josué Martínez (I)

References

American football in Mexico
Sports events cancelled due to the COVID-19 pandemic